Gotkin is a surname. Notable people with the surname include:

Hy Gotkin (1922–2004), American basketball player
Rick Gotkin (born 1959),  American ice hockey player and coach